The Prince of Egypt is a 1998 American animated musical drama film produced by DreamWorks Animation and released by DreamWorks Pictures. The first feature film from DreamWorks to be traditionally animated, it is an adaptation of the Book of Exodus and follows the life of Moses from being a prince of Egypt to a prophet of the Lord, chosen by God to carry out his ultimate destiny of leading the Jews out of Egypt. The film was directed by Brenda Chapman, Steve Hickner, and Simon Wells (in Chapman and Hickner's feature directorial debuts) with a screenplay written by Philip LaZebnik. It features songs written by Stephen Schwartz and a score composed by Hans Zimmer. The voice cast consists of Val Kilmer in a dual role, Ralph Fiennes, Michelle Pfeiffer, Sandra Bullock, Jeff Goldblum, Danny Glover, Patrick Stewart, Helen Mirren, Steve Martin, and Martin Short.

Jeffrey Katzenberg had frequently suggested an animated adaptation of the 1956 film The Ten Commandments while working for The Walt Disney Company, and he decided to put the idea into production after co-founding DreamWorks Pictures in 1994. To make this inaugural project, DreamWorks employed artists who had worked for Walt Disney Feature Animation and Amblimation, totaling a crew of 350 people from 34 countries. The film has a blend of traditional animation and computer-generated imagery, created using software from Toon Boom Animation and Silicon Graphics.

The film was released in theaters on December 18, 1998, and on home video on September 14, 1999. Reviews were generally positive; critics particularly praised the visuals, songs, and voice acting. The film grossed $218 million worldwide in theaters, which made it the most successful non-Disney animated feature at the time. The film's success led to the direct-to-video prequel and spin-off Joseph: King of Dreams (2000), and a stage musical adaptation which opened in London's West End in 2020. The song "When You Believe" became a commercially successful single in a pop version performed by Whitney Houston and Mariah Carey, and went on to win Best Original Song at the 71st Academy Awards, making it the first animated film independently outside of Disney and Pixar films, as well as the first DreamWorks Animation film to receive two nominations and win one at the Academy Awards, succeeded by Shrek (2001) and Wallace & Gromit: The Curse of the Were-Rabbit (2005).

Plot 

In Ancient Egypt, the enslaved Hebrew people pray to God for deliverance. Pharaoh Seti, fearing that the growing numbers of Hebrew slaves could lead to rebellion, orders a mass infanticide of all newborn Hebrew boys. Yocheved and her two children, Miriam and Aaron, rush to the Nile River, where she places her newborn son in a basket on the water, after bidding him farewell with a final lullaby. Miriam follows the basket as it sails to the Pharaoh's palace and witnesses her baby brother safely adopted by Seti's wife, Queen Tuya, who names him Moses. Before leaving, Miriam prays that Moses will set their people free.

Years later, Moses and his adoptive brother Rameses, heir to the throne of Egypt, are scolded by Seti for accidentally destroying a temple. After Moses suggests that Rameses be given the opportunity to prove his responsibility, Seti names Rameses prince regent and gives him authority over Egypt's temples. High priests Hotep and Huy offer Rameses a beautiful but rebellious young Midianite woman, Tzipporah. During the banquet, Moses humiliates Tzipporah by letting her fall into a pond after she refuses to submit, appeasing the crowd but disappointing Tuya. Rameses, uninterested in her stubbornness, gives Tzipporah to Moses instead and appoints him Royal Chief Architect. Later that night, Moses follows Tzipporah as she escapes from the palace, and runs into the now-adult Miriam and Aaron, whom he does not recognize. He refuses to believe their claims and opts to have them arrested until Miriam sings their mother's lullaby, triggering Moses's memory. He flees in denial, but learns the truth of Seti's genocide from a nightmare, then from Seti himself, who disturbs Moses by claiming the Hebrews were "only slaves". The next day, Moses tries to stop an Egyptian slave driver from flogging an elderly Hebrew slave, accidentally pushing the guard to his death. Horrified and ashamed, Moses flees into the desert in exile, despite Rameses's pleas that he stay.

Arriving at an oasis, Moses defends three young girls from brigands, only to find out their older sister is Tzipporah. Moses is welcomed by Jethro, Tzipporah's father and the high priest of Midian. Moses becomes a shepherd, falls in love with Tzipporah, marries her, and grows adjusted to life in Midian. Moses discovers a burning bush, through which God tells him to return to Egypt and guide the Hebrews to freedom. God bestows Moses's shepherding staff with his power and promises that he will tell Moses what to say. Tzipporah decides to join him.

Arriving in Egypt, Moses is happily greeted by Rameses, who is now Pharaoh with a wife and son. Moses requests the Hebrews' release and transforms his staff into a snake to demonstrate God's power. Hotep and Huy deceptively recreate this transformation, only to have their snakes eaten by Moses's. Not wanting to have his actions cause the empire's collapse and feeling betrayed by Moses's motives for his return, Rameses doubles the Hebrews' workload.

The Hebrews, including Aaron, blame Moses for their increased workload, disheartening Moses. However, Miriam inspires Moses to persevere. Moses casts the first of the Ten Plagues of Egypt, but Rameses remains unmoved. God inflicts eight more plagues onto Egypt, but still Rameses refuses to relent, vowing never to release the Hebrews. Disheartened, Moses prepares the Hebrews for the tenth plague, instructing them to sacrifice a lamb and mark their doorposts with its blood. That night, the final plague kills all the firstborn children of Egypt, including Rameses's son, while sparing those of the Hebrews. Grief-stricken, Rameses gives the Hebrews permission to leave. After leaving the palace, Moses collapses in grief.

The following morning, Moses, Miriam, Aaron and Tzipporah lead the Hebrews out of Egypt. At the Red Sea, the Hebrews discover that a vengeful Rameses is pursuing them with his army, intent on killing them. However, a pillar of fire blocks the army's way, while Moses uses his staff to part the sea. The Hebrews cross the open sea bottom; the fire vanishes and the army gives chase, but the sea closes over and drowns the Egyptian soldiers, sparing Rameses alone. Moses sadly bids his brother farewell and leads the Hebrews to Mount Sinai, where he receives the Ten Commandments.

Voice cast 
 Val Kilmer as Moses, a Hebrew who was adopted by Pharaoh Seti and Queen Tuya
 Kilmer also provides the uncredited voice of God
 Amick Byram provides Moses's singing voice
 Ralph Fiennes as Rameses, Moses's adoptive brother and eventual successor to Seti
 Michelle Pfeiffer as Tzipporah, Jethro's oldest daughter and Moses's wife
 Sandra Bullock as Miriam, Aaron's sister and Moses's biological sister
 Sally Dworsky provides Miriam's singing voice
 Eden Riegel provides the voice of a younger Miriam
 Jeff Goldblum as Aaron, Miriam's brother and Moses's biological brother
 Danny Glover as Jethro, Tzipporah's father and Midian's high priest
 Brian Stokes Mitchell provides Jethro's singing voice
 Patrick Stewart as Pharaoh Seti, Rameses's father and Moses's adoptive father, the Pharaoh at the beginning of the film
 Helen Mirren as Queen Tuya, Seti's wife, Rameses's mother, and Moses's adoptive mother
 Linda Dee Shayne provides Tuya's singing voice
 Steve Martin as Hotep, one of the high priests who serves as an advisor to Seti, and later Rameses. He is short and fat.
 Martin Short as Huy, Hotep's fellow high priest. He is tall and thin.
 Ofra Haza as Yocheved, Miriam and Aaron's mother and Moses's biological mother. She sang her character's number, "Deliver Us", in English and 17 other languages for the film's dubbing.
 Bobby Motown as Rameses's son
 Anne Lockhart as Hebrew Woman
 James Avery, Aria Noelle Curzon, Stephanie Sawyer and Francesca Marie Smith as additional voices
Director Brenda Chapman briefly voices Miriam when she sings the lullaby to Moses. The vocals had been recorded for a scratch audio track, which was intended to be replaced later by Sally Dworsky. The track turned out so well that it remained in the film.

Production

Development 
Former Disney chairman Jeffrey Katzenberg had always wanted to do an animated adaptation of The Ten Commandments. While working for The Walt Disney Company, Katzenberg suggested this idea to Michael Eisner, but he refused. The idea for the film was brought back at the formation of DreamWorks Pictures in 1994, when Katzenberg's partners, Amblin Entertainment founder Steven Spielberg, and music producer David Geffen, were meeting in Spielberg's living room. Katzenberg recalls that Spielberg looked at him during the meeting and said, "You ought to do The Ten Commandments."

The Prince of Egypt was "written" throughout the story process. Beginning with a starting outline, story supervisors Kelly Asbury and Lorna Cook led a team of fourteen storyboard artists and writers as they sketched out the entire film — sequence by sequence. Once the storyboards were approved, they were put into the Avid Media Composer digital editing system by editor Nick Fletcher to create a "story reel" or animatic. The story reel allowed the filmmakers to view and edit the entire film in continuity before production began, and also helped the layout and animation departments understand what is happening in each sequence of the film.  After casting of the voice talent concluded, dialogue recording sessions began. For the film, the actors record individually in a studio under guidance by one of the three directors. The voice tracks were to become the primary aspect as to which the animators built their performances. Because DreamWorks was concerned about theological accuracy, Jeffrey Katzenberg decided to call in Biblical scholars, Christian, Jewish, and Muslim theologians, and Arab American leaders to help his film be more accurate and faithful to the original story. After previewing the developing film, all these leaders noted that the studio executives listened and responded to their ideas, and praised the studio for reaching out for comment from outside sources.

Animation and design 
Art directors Kathy Altieri and Richard Chavez and production designer Darek Gogol led a team of nine visual development artists in setting a visual style for the film that was representative of the time, the scale and the architectural style of Ancient Egypt. Part of the process also included the research and collection of artwork from various artists, as well as taking part in trips such as a two-week journey across Egypt by the filmmakers before the film's production began.

Character designers Carter Goodrich, Carlos Grangel and Nico Marlet worked on setting the design and overall look of the characters. Drawing on various inspirations for the widely known characters, the team of character designers worked on designs that had a more realistic feel than the usual animated characters up to that time. Both character design and art direction worked to set a definite distinction between the symmetrical, more angular look of the Egyptians versus the more organic, natural look of the Hebrews and their related environments. The backgrounds department, headed by supervisors Paul Lasaine and Ron Lukas, oversaw a team of artists who were responsible for painting the sets/backdrops from the layouts. Within the film, approximately 934 hand-painted backgrounds were created.

The animation team for The Prince of Egypt, including 350 artists from 34 different nations, was primarily recruited both from Walt Disney Feature Animation, which had fallen under Katzenberg's auspices while at the Walt Disney Company, and from Amblimation, a defunct division of Steven Spielberg's Amblin Entertainment. As at Disney's, character animators were grouped into teams by character: for example, Kristof Serrand, as the supervising animator of Older Moses, set the acting style of the character and assigned scenes to his team. Consideration was given to depicting the ethnicities of the ancient Egyptians, Hebrews, and Nubians properly.

There are 1,192 scenes in the film, and 1,180 contain work done by the special effects department, which animates everything in an animated scene which is not a character: blowing wind, dust, rainwater, shadows, etc. A blend of traditional animation and computer-generated imagery was used in the depictions of the ten plagues of Egypt and the parting of the Red Sea. The characters were animated with the digital paint software Animo by Cambridge Animation (now merged with Toon Boom Technologies), and the compositing of the 2D and 3D elements was done using the "Exposure Tool", a digital solution developed for Alias Research by Silicon Graphics. Additional final line animation was outsourced to Bardel Entertainment, Fox Animation Studios and Heart of Texas Productions.

Creating the voice of God 
The task of creating God's voice was given to Lon Bender and the team working with the film's music composer, Hans Zimmer. "The challenge with that voice was to try to evolve it into something that had not been heard before," says Bender. "We did a lot of research into the voices that had been used for past Hollywood movies as well as for radio shows, and we were trying to create something that had never been previously heard not only from a casting standpoint but from a voice manipulation standpoint as well." It was decided that the voice of God would be provided by Val Kilmer, who portrayed Moses in the film, in order to indicate that God was communicating to him via the voice he would otherwise perceive in his mind, as opposed to the "larger-than-life tones" used to portray God in previous theatrical releases.

Music 

Composer and lyricist Stephen Schwartz began working on writing songs for the film from the beginning of its production. As the story evolved, he continued to write songs that would serve both to entertain and help move the story along. Composer Hans Zimmer arranged and produced the songs and then eventually wrote the film's score. The film's score was recorded entirely in London.

Three soundtrack albums were released simultaneously for The Prince of Egypt, each of them aimed towards a different target audience. While the other two accompanying records, the country-themed "Nashville" soundtrack and the gospel-based "Inspirational" soundtrack, functioned as film tributes, the official The Prince of Egypt soundtrack contained the actual songs from the film. This album combines elements from the score composed by Hans Zimmer and film songs by Stephen Schwartz. The songs were either voiced over by professional singers, such as Salisbury Cathedral Choir, or sung by the film's voice actors, such as Michelle Pfeiffer and Ofra Haza. Various tracks by contemporary artists such as K-Ci & JoJo and Boyz II Men were added, including the Mariah Carey and Whitney Houston duet "When You Believe", a Babyface rewrite of the original Schwartz composition, sung by Michelle Pfeiffer and Sally Dworsky in the film.

Release 
The Prince of Egypt had its premiere at UCLA's Royce Hall on December 16, 1998, with its wide release occurring two days later. Despite being the inaugural production by DreamWorks Animation, it wound up the second to get a theatrical release, as Antz was rushed to reach theatres in October. The international release occurred simultaneously with that of the United States, as according to DreamWorks' distribution chief Jim Tharp, opening one week prior to the "global holiday" of Christmas, audiences all over the world would be available at the same time.

The accompanying marketing campaign was aimed to appeal to adults, usually averse to animated films. Merchandising was limited to a line of collectable figures and books. Wal-Mart served as a promotional partner and offered in stores a package featuring two tickets to The Prince of Egypt, a storybook and the film's soundtrack. The Prince of Egypt: Classic Edition storybook, published by Dutton Children's Books in 1998, was written by Jane Yolen and illustrated by Michael Koelsch. Koelsch received an honorable mention from the Society of Illustrators for this book's illustrations.

Home media 
The Prince of Egypt was released on DVD, VHS, and Laserdisc on September 14, 1999. The ownership of the film was assumed by DreamWorks Animation when that company split from DreamWorks Pictures in 2004; as of July 2018, the rights to the film are now owned by Universal Pictures via its acquisition of DWA. A Blu-ray of the movie was released on October 16, 2018. For the 25th anniversary of the film, a 4K Blu-ray was released on March 14, 2023. However, every release of the film on home media used a 35mm print of the film, rather than using the original files to encode the movie directly to digital.

Reception

Box office 
On its opening weekend, the film grossed $14.5 million for a $4,658 average from 3,118 theaters, earning second place at the box office, behind You've Got Mail. Due to the holiday season, the film gained 4% in its second weekend, earning $15.1 million and finishing in fourth place. It would hold well in its third weekend, with only a 25% drop to $11.2 million for a $3,511 average from 3,202 theaters and once again finishing in fourth place.

Critical response 
On review aggregator Rotten Tomatoes, the film holds an approval rating of 79% based on 92 reviews and an average rating of 7.1/10. The website's critics consensus reads: "The Prince of Egypts stunning visuals and first-rate voice cast more than compensate for the fact that it's better crafted than it is emotionally involving." Metacritic, which uses a weighted average, assigned the film a score of 64 out of 100 based on 26 critics, indicating "generally favorable reviews". Audiences polled by CinemaScore gave the film an average grade of "A" on an A+ to F scale.

Roger Ebert of the Chicago Sun-Times praised the film in his review saying, "The Prince of Egypt is one of the best-looking animated films ever made. It employs computer-generated animation as an aid to traditional techniques, rather than as a substitute for them, and we sense the touch of human artists in the vision behind the Egyptian monuments, the lonely desert vistas, the thrill of the chariot race, the personalities of the characters. This is a film that shows animation growing up and embracing more complex themes, instead of chaining itself in the category of children's entertainment." Richard Corliss of Time magazine gave a negative review of the film saying, "The film lacks creative exuberance, any side pockets of joy." Stephen Hunter from The Washington Post praised the film saying, "The movie's proudest accomplishment is that it revises our version of Moses toward something more immediate and believable, more humanly knowable."

Lisa Alspector from the Chicago Reader praised the film and wrote, "The blend of animation techniques somehow demonstrates mastery modestly, while the special effects are nothing short of magnificent." Houston Chronicle Jeff Millar reviewed by saying, "The handsomely animated Prince of Egypt is an amalgam of Hollywood biblical epic, Broadway supermusical and nice Sunday school lesson." James Berardinelli from Reelviews highly praised the film saying, "The animation in The Prince of Egypt is truly top-notch, and is easily a match for anything Disney has turned out in the last decade", and also wrote "this impressive achievement uncovers yet another chink in Disney's once-impregnable animation armor." Liam Lacey of The Globe and Mail gave a somewhat negative review and wrote, "Prince of Egypt is spectacular but takes itself too seriously." MovieGuide also reviewed the film favorably, saying that "The Prince of Egypt takes animated movies to a new level of entertainment. Magnificent art, music, story, and realization combine to make The Prince of Egypt one of the most entertaining masterpieces of all time."

When the film reached its 20th anniversary, SyFy made a retrospective review of The Prince of Egypt, calling it the greatest animated film of all time, predominantly due to its voice cast, animation, characters, cinematography, and most importantly, its musical score.

The film is also regarded as one of the best Biblical film adaptations of all time, alongside films like The Ten Commandments, Ben-Hur and The Passion of the Christ.

Censorship 
The Prince of Egypt was banned in the Maldives, Malaysia and Egypt, all state Islam countries, on the grounds that Islamic prophets (who include Moses) are not to be visually depicted. The film was also banned in Indonesia, but was later released in video CD format.

The Supreme Council of Islamic Affairs in the Maldives stated: "All prophets and messengers of God are revered in Islam, and therefore cannot be portrayed". Following this ruling, the censor board banned the film in January 1999. In the same month, the Film Censorship Board of Malaysia banned the film "so as not to offend the country's majority Muslim population." The board's secretary said that the censor body ruled the film was "insensitive for religious and moral reasons".

Accolades

American Film Institute recognition 
The film is recognized by American Film Institute in these lists:
 2004: AFI's 100 Years...100 Songs:
 "When You Believe" – Nominated

Prequel 

In November 2000, DreamWorks Animation released Joseph: King of Dreams, a direct-to-video prequel based on the story of Joseph from the Book of Genesis. The project began during production of The Prince of Egypt, employing some of the same animation crew and featuring director Steve Hickner as an executive producer.

Stage musical 

A stage musical adaptation debuted at TheatreWorks in Mountain View, California on October 14, 2017. The show had an international premiere on April 6, 2018, in Denmark at the Fredericia Teater. It made its West End debut at the Dominion Theatre on February 5, 2020, with an official opening on February 25 and was to spend a 39-week engagement through October 31, 2020. Performances were then halted on March 17, 2020, due to the COVID-19 pandemic. The show reopened on July 1, 2021, and ran through January 8, 2022.

See also 
 List of films featuring slavery

Notes 

  In July 2014, the film's distribution rights were purchased by DreamWorks Animation from Paramount Pictures and transferred to 20th Century Fox. The rights were moved to Universal Pictures in 2018 after the buyout of DreamWorks Animation by Comcast/NBCUniversal.

  During the production of The Prince of Egypt, DreamWorks had hoped that the film would be a box office success, so they had been pressuring employees to work on the film, but if they were unable to work on the film, they were then forced to work on Shrek, which was expected to flop. Despite this, Shrek was the victor in the box office, as The Prince of Egypt was only a moderate success.

References

Further reading

External links 

 
 
 
 

 
1998 films
1990s English-language films
1998 animated films
1990s adventure films
1990s American animated films
1990s musical drama films
1998 musical films
1990s romance films
American children's animated adventure films
American children's animated drama films
American children's animated musical films
American adventure drama films
American coming-of-age films
American epic films
American musical drama films
American romantic drama films
Animated coming-of-age films
Animated romance films
Animated films about brothers
Animated films about orphans
Best Animated Feature Broadcast Film Critics Association Award winners
Censored films
Film controversies
Religious controversies in animation
Religious controversies in film
DreamWorks Animation animated films
DreamWorks Pictures films
Musicals based on the Bible
Films scored by Hans Zimmer
Films about Jews and Judaism
Films about slavery
Films about Christianity
Films about the ten plagues of Egypt
Films based on the Book of Exodus
Films directed by Brenda Chapman
Films directed by Simon Wells
Films directed by Steve Hickner
Films set in the 13th century BC
Films set in ancient Egypt
Films set in Egypt
Films set in palaces
Films that won the Best Original Song Academy Award
Fiction about God
Portrayals of Moses in film
Cultural depictions of Ramesses II
Religious drama films
Religious epic films
Films with screenplays by Nicholas Meyer
Films with screenplays by Philip LaZebnik
Seti I
Films adapted into plays
1998 directorial debut films
1998 drama films
1990s children's animated films